Pakistan participated in the 3rd South Asian Games held in Calcutta, India in November 1987. The country participated in all of the 10 sports: athletics, basketball, boxing, football, kabbadi, swimming, table tennis, volleyball, weightlifting and wrestling. Its medal tally of 66 placed it second amongst the seven nations. Weightlifting was its most successful event, where it won 29 medals (6 gold, 23 silver).

Athletes 
 Athletics:
 Basketball:
 Boxing: 
 Football:
 Kabbadi: 
 Swimming:
 Table Tennis:
 Volleyball:
 Weightlifting:
 Wrestling:

References

1987 South Asian Games
1987 in Pakistani sport
Pakistan at the South Asian Games